Lawrence Harris was an American painter who was born in Colorado Springs, Colorado in 1937.  He studied art in both the United States and Europe.  Harris is known for both impressionistic paintings (such as Abandoned Ship) and abstract compositions (such as The Cross).

His paintings are generally not dated and signed “L Harris” with the ‘L’ and ‘H’ partially superimposed.  The Denver Art Museum is among the public collections holding work by Lawrence Harris. This artist should not be confused with the Canadian landscape painter Lawren Harris (1885–1970).

Auction record
The auction record for a painting by Lawrence Harris is $1,170. This record was set by Abandoned Ship, 72 by 48 inch oil painting on board sold December 13, 2007, at Best of the West Auctions (Colorado Springs, Colorado).

References
 Dunbier, Lonnie Pierson (Editor), The Artists’ Bluebook, Scottsdale, AZ, 2005, p. 479.
 Shalkop, Robert L., A Show of Color, 100 Years of Painting in the Pike's Peak Region, Colorado Springs, Colorado Springs Fine Arts Center, 1971, p. 94.

External links
 Lawrence Harris in AskART}

Footnotes

Painters from Colorado
20th-century American painters
American male painters
21st-century American painters
American Impressionist painters
Living people
1937 births
Artists from Colorado Springs, Colorado
20th-century African-American painters
21st-century African-American artists
20th-century American male artists